Actinopolyspora is a genus in the phylum Actinomycetota (Bacteria).

Etymology
The name Actinopolyspora means "the many-spored actinomycete" (aktis, aktinos (ἀκτίς, ἀκτῖνος), nominally meaning a beam, but in effect meaning an actinomycete-like bacterium, poly meaning many, spora meaning spores)

Species
The genus contains 11 species (including basonyms and synonyms), namely
 A. alba Tang et al. 2011
 A. algeriensis Meklat et al. 2013
 A. biskrensis Saker et al. 2015
 "A. dayingensis" Guan et al. 2013
 A. erythraea Tang et al. 2011
 A. halophila Gochnauer et al. 1975 (Approved Lists)

 A. lacussalsi Guan et al. 2013
 A. mortivallis Yoshida et al. 1991
 A. mzabensis Meklat et al. 2013
 A. righensis Meklat et al. 2014
 A. saharensis Meklat et al. 2013
 A. salinaria Duangmal et al. 2016
 A. xinjiangensis Guan et al. 2011

See also
 Bacterial taxonomy
 Microbiology

References

Bacteria genera
Actinomycetia